Morania is a genus of cyanobacterium preserved as carbonaceous films in the Middle Cambrian Burgess Shale. it is present throughout the shale; 2580 specimens of Morania are known from the Greater Phyllopod bed, where they comprise 4.90% of the community. It is filamentous, forms sheets, and resembles the modern cyanobacterium Nostoc. It would have had a role in binding the sediment, and would have been a food source for such organisms as Odontogriphus and Wiwaxia.

References

External links 
 

†Morania
Prehistoric bacteria
Burgess Shale fossils
Wheeler Shale
Cambrian genus extinctions